Said Najafzade (born 14 January 1999) is an Azerbaijani Paralympic athlete. He represented Azerbaijan at the 2020 Summer Paralympics.

Career
Sapozhnikova represented Azerbaijan in the men's long jump T12 event at the 2020 Summer Paralympics and won a bronze medal.

References

1999 births
Living people
People from Sumgait
Azerbaijani male long jumpers
Medalists at the World Para Athletics European Championships
Paralympic bronze medalists for Azerbaijan
Athletes (track and field) at the 2020 Summer Paralympics
Paralympic athletes of Azerbaijan
Paralympic medalists in athletics (track and field)
Medalists at the 2020 Summer Paralympics
21st-century Azerbaijani people